Salim Khan (born 1935) is an Indian film actor.

Salim Khan may also refer to:

Salim Khan (Shaki khan) (1795–1797), the sixth khan of Shaki
Salim Khan I, or Selim I, Sultan of the Ottoman Empire 1512–1520 
Salim Khan Shams al-Dinlu, an early 17th-century Safavid military leader
Saleem Khan, a town in Khyber-Pakhtunkhwa, Pakistan